The Courier is an Israeli Russian-language daily newspaper.

The paper was founded in 1991 by Israel Libo Feigin. It is published in Tel Aviv and has had an internet edition since 1998.

See also
Russians in Israel
Newspapers in Israel

References

External links
 Official Site

1991 establishments in Israel
Ashkenazi Jewish culture in Tel Aviv
Publications established in 1991
Mass media in Tel Aviv
Russian-language newspapers published in Israel
Non-Hebrew-language newspapers published in Israel
Daily newspapers published in Israel